Luis Ezequiel Unsain (born 9 March 1995) is an Argentine professional footballer who plays as a goalkeeper for Argentine Primera División side Defensa y Justicia.

Career
Unsain started his career in 2015 with Argentine Primera División team Newell's Old Boys, after youth spells with them and Union de Alcaraz. He was an unused substitute seven times during 2015 prior to making his professional debut on 16 August in a 0–0 draw at home to Temperley. Fifteen appearances followed during 2015 and 2016. In the middle of 2016–17, on 8 March, Unsain departed Newell's to join fellow Primera División side Defensa y Justicia. In 2016–17, Unsain was an unused substitute twenty-six times for Newell's and Defensa. His Defensa debut arrived in May 2017 in a Copa Argentina victory at home to Sol de Mayo.

Career statistics
.

References

External links

1995 births
Living people
Sportspeople from Entre Ríos Province
Argentine footballers
Association football goalkeepers
Argentine Primera División players
Newell's Old Boys footballers
Defensa y Justicia footballers